Henning Otte (born 1968) is a German politician and member of the Christian Democratic Union of Germany (CDU).

Life and career 
Otte was born on 27 October 1968 in Celle, Lower Saxony. After taking his A levels (Abitur) in the Christian Gymnasium in Hermannsburg Otte did his military service as a short service volunteer with the Bundeswehr and also underwent training as a reserve officer. Subsequently he passed his training as a banker with Sparkasse Celle before studying law at the University of Hamburg. Otte was last employed as a company lawyer (Prokurist) in a medium-sized steel construction firm.

Henning Otte is protestant, married and a father of four.

Political career 
Otte joined the CDU in 1994 and has belonged since 1999 to the board of the CDU district association in Celle. Since 2006 he has been a member of the board of the European People's Party (EVP) and since 2007 deputy chairman of the CDU District Association of Northeast Lower Saxony.

Since 1996 Otte has been a town councillor (Stadtrat) for Bergen, a parish councillor (Ortsrat) for Eversen and a member of the district council (Kreistag) for the district or county of Celle. He is currently the deputy head of the district authority (Landrat) for the district of Celle.

Member of Parliament, 2005–present 
In the 2005 elections, Otte became a member of parliament in the German Bundestag, where he is on the state list for Lower Saxony. In 2009 he was given the direct mandate for the constituency of Celle – Uelzen with 44.2% of first votes, defeating Kirsten Lühmann of the Social Democratic Party who has since entered the Bundestag on the Lower Saxon state list.

In parliament, Otte is a member of the Defence Committee and deputy member of the Committee on Foreign Affairs. He is currently the CDU/CSU defence policy spokesman in the Bundestag. 

In addition to his committee assignments, Otte has been a member of the German delegation to the NATO Parliamentary Assembly since 2014, where he is part of the Defence and Security Committee. Between 2009 and 2013, he was also part of the Parliamentary Friendship Group for Relations with the Baltic States as well as of the Parliamentary Friendship Group for Relations with the States of South America. Since 2019, he has been a member of the German delegation to the Franco-German Parliamentary Assembly.

In the negotiations to form a coalition government following the 2013 federal elections, Otte was part of the CDU/CSU delegation in the working group on foreign affairs, defense policy and development cooperation, led by Thomas de Maizière and Frank-Walter Steinmeier. In the coalition talks following the 2017 federal elections, he was again appointed to the working group on foreign policy, defense and development, this time led by Ursula von der Leyen, Gerd Müller and Sigmar Gabriel.

In his capacity as member of the Defence Committee, Otte has traveled extensively to visit Bundeswehr troops on their missions abroad, including in Kabul (2012), Mazar-i-Sharif (2012, 2013) and Gao (2016) and at the Incirlik Air Base (2016). In 2015, he accompanied German Minister of Defence Ursula von der Leyen to meetings with King Abdullah II of Jordan and President Beji Caid Essebsi of Tunisia, among others.

Other activities
 German Association for Defence Technology (DWT), Deputy Chairman
 Association of the German Army (FKH), Member of the Presidium
 Soldiers and Veterans Foundation (SVS), Member of the Board of Trustees
 Saint Barbara Foundation for Land Mine Victims, Member of the Board of Trustees 
 Celle General Hospital (AKH), Deputy Member of the Supervisory Board

External links 
 Henning Otte website 
 Parliamentary biography 
 Biography at the CDU/CSU Bundestag party site

References 

People from Celle
Members of the Bundestag for Lower Saxony
1968 births
Living people
Members of the Bundestag 2021–2025
Members of the Bundestag 2017–2021
Members of the Bundestag 2013–2017
Members of the Bundestag 2009–2013
Members of the Bundestag 2005–2009
Members of the Bundestag for the Christian Democratic Union of Germany